The Beijing Eagles, officially the Beijing Shougang Eagles (北京首钢金鹰女垒), are a women's professional softball team.  Established in May 2017, the team plays in the National Pro Fastpitch (NPF). In the 2019 NPF Season the team will play all their home games at Jackie Robinson Ballpark.  Managed by Chinese Softball Association, the Eagles' roster is mainly populated with players from the China women's national softball team as a means to gain professional experience against the highest levels of fastpitch play, in anticipation of softball's return to the Olympics in 2020.

History
2017

On May 2, 2017 NPF announced the addition of an expansion team, Beijing Shougang Eagles.  Its roster is to be populated with members of China women's national softball team and selected American players. For 2017, the home half Beijing's schedule will be played in the home venues of the other NPF teams.  Beijing is expected to announce a permanent US home location in the future.

At a press conference in Beijing, the Eagles announced that Teresa Wilson would be their first head coach, with assistants Breanne Lewis and Thomas Hazelhurst.  Wilson had previously coached in the NCAA for 24 years and coached in the NPF in 2012 with the Carolina Diamonds.

The Eagles finished their first season with three wins in 47 games, missing the playoffs.

Team

General managers
 (2017–present)

All-time head coaches

Season-by-season 

|-
|align=center|2017 || 3 || 44 || 0 || 6th place National Pro Fastpitch || Did Not Qualify
|-
|align=center|2018 || 13 || 33 || 0 || 4th place National Pro Fastpitch || Did Not Qualify
|-
!Totals || 16|| 77 || 0
|colspan="2"|

Current roster

References

External links 

2017 establishments in the United States
Beijing Eagles
Softball teams
National Pro Fastpitch teams
Sports clubs established in 2017
Diaspora sports clubs in the United States